The IMOCA 60 Class yacht Bonduelle 2, FRA 59 was designed by Marc Lombard and launched in the April 2004 after being built JMV based in Cherbourg, France. The boat was lost during the 2008-2009 Vendee Globe following the loss of the keel bulb the skipper Jean Le Cam was rescued by fellow competitor Vincent Riou

Racing results

Gallery

References 

Individual sailing vessels
2000s sailing yachts
Sailing yachts designed by Marc Lombard
Vendée Globe boats
IMOCA 60